Proline synthetase co-transcribed bacterial homolog protein is a protein that in humans is encoded by the PROSC gene.

References

Further reading